Ruth Lange is a Danish sprint canoeist who competed in the late 1930s. She won a bronze medal in the K-2 600 m event at the 1938 ICF Canoe Sprint World Championships in Vaxholm.

References

Danish female canoeists
Possibly living people
Year of birth missing
ICF Canoe Sprint World Championships medalists in kayak